The Great Jazz Trio at the Village Vanguard Vol. 2 is a live album by the Great Jazz Trio – pianist Hank Jones, bassist Ron Carter and drummer Tony Williams – recorded in 1977 for the Japanese East Wind label.

Reception 

Allmusic awarded the album 4 stars, stating: "Jones leads the way with his always elegant boppish arrangements; there are also plenty of solo opportunities for his bandmates in these intimate recordings, which give you the feeling of sitting right in front of the bandstand." On All About Jazz John Kelman noted: "Carter and Williams had a shared history as part of Miles Davis' more outward-reaching second quintet in the mid-'60s, so they had just the right combination of traditionalism and outside-the-box spontaneity to make this set—consisting of one Charlie Parker tune, one standard, a Davis tune, and a Williams original—a potent blend of reverence and liberated musical thinking."

Track listing 
 "Confirmation" (Charlie Parker) - 9:54
 "Wind Flower" (Sara Cassey) - 8:16
 "Nardis" (Miles Davis) - 11:03
 "Lawra" (Tony Williams) - 8:53

Personnel 
Hank Jones - piano
Ron Carter - bass
Tony Williams - drums

References 

1977 live albums
Great Jazz Trio live albums
East Wind Records live albums
Albums recorded at the Village Vanguard